Sir John Wilfred Peace CStJ,  (born 2 March 1949) is a British businessman, ex-chairman of British fashion house Burberry and ex-chairman of Standard Chartered, a British multinational banking and financial services company. Since 2017, he is Chancellor of Nottingham Trent University.

Early life
Peace was born into a mining family at Mansfield in Nottinghamshire (where he still has a home) and attended school there. He was then educated at the Royal Military Academy Sandhurst.

Career
Peace joined GUS plc after leaving Sandhurst, rising to group chief executive. He held this position from 2000 to 2006. He was Chairman of Experian plc from 2006 to 2014.

Peace is chairman of Standard Chartered Bank and non-executive chairman of Burberry Group plc since June 2002.

Since February 2016, he has been independent chair of Sub-national Transport Body Midlands Connect, which was set up in 2014 to produce a long-term transport strategy for the Midlands region. In June 2016, he was appointed chair of the Midlands Engine, which was set up by the government to raise productivity and economic growth in the Midlands region, and of which Midlands Connect is the transport arm.

Since 2017, he has been Chancellor of Nottingham Trent University.

Other positions
Peace became Lord Lieutenant of Nottinghamshire from 21 July 2012. He was knighted in 2011 for services to business and the voluntary sector.

Personal life
John Peace married Christine "Chris" Blakemore in 1971.  They had met at school and started dating when he was 18.   She is a school teacher:  the couple have three daughters.

References

Living people
1949 births
British chairpersons of corporations
British chief executives
Knights Bachelor
Lord-Lieutenants of Nottinghamshire
Graduates of the Royal Military Academy Sandhurst
People from Mansfield
Businesspeople awarded knighthoods
People associated with Nottingham Trent University
Burberry people